Manhattan Prep (MGPrep, Inc.) is an American test preparation company. The company was founded in 2000 in New York City by Zeke Vanderhoek, founder of the TEP charter school and a former New York public junior-high school teacher. It focuses on preparation for the GMAT, GRE, and LSAT. In December 2009, Manhattan Prep was acquired by Kaplan, Inc.

Test preparation
Manhattan Prep offers both on-site and virtual preparatory programs for students worldwide. Its curriculum is designed around on a "content based" approach that teaches the material covered on the exam rather than solely focusing on test-beating strategies. Their study guides are published by Simon & Schuster.

Allegations against former CEO
In September 2019 in a testimony before the New York City Commission on Gender Equity, former employee Kimberly Watkins testified that former CEO Andrew Yang had fired her because he felt that she would not work as hard now that she was married. Yang has denied the allegations, saying that "Kimberly Watkins' facts about her break from Manhattan Prep are inaccurate. During my more than a decade as CEO, I have worked with many women, married and otherwise, and value their work and dedication as important to the success of any institution". In an appearance on The View, Yang said that "I've had so many phenomenal women leaders that have elevated me and my organizations at every phase of my career, and if I was that kind of person I would never have had any success".

See also
Storefront school

References

External links
 Company Website

Standardized tests in the United States
Test preparation companies